The Royal New Brunswick Regiment (RNBR) is a reserve infantry regiment of the Canadian Army based in New Brunswick. The Royal New Brunswick Regiment is part of 37 Canadian Brigade Group, 5th Canadian Division. The RNBR holds 65 battle honours.

Creation 
The regiment was formed in 1954 by the amalgamation of The Carleton and York Regiment, The New Brunswick Scottish and The North Shore (New Brunswick) Regiment. From 1954 to 2012, it consisted of two battalions with the former The Carleton and York Regiment and The New Brunswick Scottish forming the 1st Battalion and The North Shore Regiment forming the 2nd Battalion. However, in 2012, the 2nd Battalion was once again reorganised as a distinct regiment, The North Shore (New Brunswick) Regiment.

Present structure

Lineage

The Royal New Brunswick Regiment

Formed 10 September 1869 in Woodstock, New Brunswick as The Carleton Light Infantry
Redesignated 5 November 1869 as the 67th The Carleton Light Infantry
Redesignated 8 May 1900 as the 67th Regiment "Carleton Light Infantry"
Redesignated 15 March 1920 as The Carleton Light Infantry
Amalgamated 15 December 1936 with The York Regiment and renamed The Carleton and York Regiment
Redesignated 7 November 1940 as the 2nd (Reserve) Battalion, The Carleton and York Regiment
Redesignated 1 November 1945 as The Carleton and York Regiment
Amalgamated 31 October 1954 The New Brunswick Scottish and redesignated the 1st Battalion, The New Brunswick Regiment (Carleton and York)
18 May 1956 regiment redesignated as The Royal New Brunswick Regiment.

On 4 May 1951, The Carleton and York Regiment mobilized two temporary Active Force companies designated "E" and "F" Company. "E" Company was reduced to nil strength upon its personnel being incorporated into the 1st Canadian Infantry Battalion (later the 3rd Battalion, The Canadian Guards) for service in Germany with the North Atlantic Treaty Organization, and was disbanded on 29 July 1953. "F" Company was initially used as a reinforcement pool for "E" Company. On 15 May 1952, it was reduced to nil strength, upon its personnel being absorbed by the newly formed 2nd Canadian Infantry Battalion (later the 4th Battalion, The Canadian Guards) for service in Korea with the United Nations and was disbanded on 29 July 1953.

The York Regiment

Formed 10 September 1869 as The York Provisional Volunteer Battalion
Redesignated 12 November 1869 as the 71st "York" Volunteer Battalion
Redesignated 8 May 1900 as the 71st York Regiment
Redesignated 15 March 1920 as The York Regiment
Amalgamated 15 December 1936 with The Carleton Light Infantry.

The New Brunswick Scottish

 Formed 31 August 1946 on the Amalgamation of The New Brunswick Rangers and The Saint John Fusiliers (Machine Gun) as The South New Brunswick Regiment
 Redesignated 2 December 1946 as The New Brunswick Scottish
Amalgamated 31 October 1954 with The Carleton and York Regiment and redesignated as the 1st Battalion, The New Brunswick Regiment (Carleton and York).

The New Brunswick Rangers

Originated 12 August 1870 in Sussex, New Brunswick as the 74th Battalion of Infantry
Redesignated 8 May 1900 as the 74th Regiment
Redesignated 2 November 1903 as the 74th Regiment "The Brunswick Rangers"
Redesignated 15 March 1920 as The New Brunswick Rangers
Redesignated 1 January 1941 as the 2nd (Reserve) Battalion, The New Brunswick Rangers
Redesignated 15 February 1946 as The New Brunswick Rangers
Amalgamated 31 August 1946 with The Saint John Fusiliers (Machine Gun) and redesignated as The South New Brunswick Regiment (later The New Brunswick Scottish)

The Saint John Fusiliers

Formed 22 March 1872 as the 62nd "St. John" Battalion of Infantry
Redesignated 14 April 1882 as the 62nd Battalion "Saint John Fusiliers"
Redesignated 8 May 1900 as the 62nd Regiment "St. John Fusiliers"
Redesignated 15 March 1920 as The St. John Fusiliers
Redesignated 2 September 1925 as The Saint John Fusiliers
Amalgamated on 15 December 1936 with the Headquarters and Headquarters Squadron of The New Brunswick Dragoons and A Company of the 7th Machine Gun Battalion, CMGC and redesignated as The Saint John Fusiliers (Machine Gun)
Redesignated 1 January 1941 as the 2nd (Reserve) Battalion, The Saint John Fusiliers (Machine Gun)
Redesignated 1 June 1945 as The Saint John Fusiliers (Machine Gun)
Amalgamated 31 August 1946 with The New Brunswick Rangers.

The Saint John Fusiliers have no lineal connection with the 62nd The St. John Volunteer Battalion, N.B. of 1869 to 1871.

The New Brunswick Dragoons

Formed 2 March 1911 in Saint John, New Brunswick as the 28th "New Brunswick" Dragoons
Redesignated 15 March 1920 as The New Brunswick Dragoons
Amalgamated 15 December 1936 with The Saint John Fusiliers.

7th Machine Gun Battalion, CMGC
Formed 1 June 1919 in Saint John, New Brunswick as the 7th Machine Gun Battalion, CMGC
A Company amalgamated 15 December 1936 with The Saint John Fusiliers.  Headquarters and B Company redesignated as The New Brunswick Regiment (Tank) (subsequently disbanded in 1959 as the 64th Light Anti-Aircraft Regiment (New Brunswick Regiment), RCA). C Company was amalgamated with other sub-units and redesignated the 104th Field Battery, RCA (reduced to nil strength and transferred to the Supplementary Order of Battle in 1966).

St. John Rifle Company
Formed 8 July 1862 in Saint John, New Brunswick as the Western Militia District Engineer Company
Redesignated 6 February 1869 as The St. John Engineer Company
Redesignated 28 May 1869 as The New Brunswick Engineers Company
Converted to infantry 13 January 1882 and redesignated the St. John Rifle CompanyAmalgamated 1 December 1898 with the 62nd Battalion "Saint John Fusiliers" to form an additional infantry company

Charts

Perpetuations

War Of 1812
1st Battalion, Northumberland County Regiment
2nd Battalion, Northumberland County Regiment
3rd Battalion, Northumberland County Regiment
1st Battalion, Saint John County Regiment
1st Battalion, York County Regiment
2nd Battalion, York County Regiment

The regiment also carries two battle honours from the War of 1812 in commemoration of the New Brunswick Fencible Infantry (104th Regiment of Foot) which was recruited in New Brunswick and served during that conflict.

The Great War
12th Battalion, CEF
26th Battalion (New Brunswick), CEF
55th Battalion (New Brunswick & Prince Edward Island), CEF
104th Battalion, CEF
115th Battalion (New Brunswick), CEF
140th Battalion (St. John's Tigers), CEF
145th Battalion (New Brunswick), CEF
236th Battalion (New Brunswick Kilties), CEF
28th Field Battery, Canadian Field Artillery, CEF.

Operational history

South African War
Both the 62nd Regiment St. John Fusiliers and 71st York Regiment contributed volunteers for the Canadian Contingents during the South African War.

The Great War
Details of the 62nd Regiment St. John Fusiliers, 67th Regiment Carleton Light Infantry, 71st York Regiment, and 74th Regiment The Brunswick Rangers were placed on active service on 6 August 1914 for local protective duty.

The 26th Battalion (New Brunswick), CEF, was authorized on 7 November 1914 and embarked for Britain on 15 June 1915. It arrived in France on 16 September 1915, where it fought as part of the 5th Infantry Brigade, 2nd Canadian Division in France and Flanders throughout the war. The battalion was disbanded on 30 August 1920.

The 55th Battalion (New Brunswick & Prince Edward Island), CEF, was authorized on 7 November 1914 and embarked for Britain on 30 October 1915, where it provided reinforcements for the Canadian Corps in the field until 6 July 1916, when its personnel were absorbed by the 40th Battalion (Nova Scotia), CEF. The battalion was disbanded on 21 May 1917.

The 104th Battalion, CEF, was authorized on 22 December 1915 and embarked for Britain on 28 June 1916, where it provided reinforcements for the Canadian Corps in the field until 24 January 1917, when its personnel were absorbed by the 105th Battalion (Prince Edward Island Highlanders), CEF. The battalion was disbanded on 27 July 1918.

The 115th Battalion (New Brunswick), CEF, was authorized on 22 December 1915 and embarked for Britain on 23 July 1916, where it provided reinforcements for the Canadian Corps in the field until 21 October 1916, when its personnel were absorbed by the 112th Battalion (Nova Scotia), CEF. The battalion was disbanded on 1 September 1917.

The 140th Battalion (St. John's Tigers), CEF, was authorized on 22 December 1915 and embarked for Britain on 25 September 1916, where, on 2 November 1916, its personnel were absorbed by the depots of The Royal Canadian Regiment, CEF and Princess Patricia's Canadian Light Infantry, CEF to provide reinforcements for the Canadian Corps in the field. The battalion was disbanded on 27 July 1918.

The 145th Battalion (New Brunswick), CEF was authorized on 22 December 1915 and embarked for Britain on 25 September 1916, where, on 7 October 1916, its personnel were absorbed by the 9th Reserve Battalion, CEF to provide reinforcements for the Canadian Corps in the field. The battalion was disbanded on 17 July 1917.

The 236th Battalion (New Brunswick Kilties), CEF was authorized on 15 July 1916 and embarked for Britain on 30 October and 9 November 1917, where it provided reinforcements for the Canadian Corps in the field until 13 March 1918, when its personnel were absorbed by the 20th Reserve Battalion, CEF. The battalion was disbanded on 30 August 1920.

The Second World War
Details of the New Brunswick Rangers and The Saint John Fusiliers (Machine Gun) were called out on 26 August 1939 and then placed on active service on 1 September 1939 for local protection duties until disbanded on 31 December 1940.

The Carleton and York Regiment mobilized The Carleton and York Regiment, CASF, on 1 September 1939. It was redesignated the 1st Battalion, The Carleton and York Regiment, CASF, on 7 November 1940. It embarked for Britain on 9 December 1939 and landed in Sicily on 10 July 1943 and in Italy on 3 September 1943 as part of the 3rd Canadian Infantry Brigade, 1st Canadian Infantry Division. On 16 March 1945, it moved to North-West Europe as part of Operation Goldflake, where it fought until the end of the war. The overseas battalion was disbanded on 30 September 1945. On 1 June 1945, a second Active Force battalion was mobilized for service in the Pacific, under the designation 2nd Canadian Infantry Battalion, (The Carleton and York Regiment), CASF. The battalion was disbanded on 1 November 1945.

The New Brunswick Rangers mobilized the 1st Battalion, The New Brunswick Rangers, CASF, on 1 January 1941. It was redesignated as The 10th Canadian Infantry Brigade Support Group (The New Brunswick Rangers), CIC, CASF on 1 November 1943 and as The 10th Independent Machine Gun Company (The New Brunswick Rangers), CIC, CASF on 24 February 1944. The unit served at Goose Bay, Labrador in a home defence role as part of Atlantic Command from June 1942 to July 1943. It embarked for Britain on 13 September 1943. On 26 July 1944, the company landed in France as part of the 10th Canadian Infantry Brigade, 4th Canadian Armoured Division, and it continued to fight in North-West Europe until the end of the war. The overseas company was disbanded on 15 February 1946.

The Saint John Fusiliers (Machine Gun) mobilized the 1st Battalion, The Saint John Fusiliers (Machine Gun), CASF, on 1 January 1941. It served in Canada as part of the 18th Infantry Brigade, 6th Canadian Division, and "C" Company of this unit took part in the expedition to Kiska, Alaska as a component of the 13th Canadian Infantry Brigade Group, serving there from 16 August 1943 to 6 January 1944. It embarked for Britain on 2 January 1945, where it was disbanded on 10 January 1945.

War In Afghanistan
The regiment contributed an aggregate of more than 20% of its authorized strength to the various Task Forces which served in Afghanistan between 2002 and 2014.

Battle honours
In the list below, battle honours in capitals were awarded for participation in large operations and campaigns, while those in lowercase indicate honours granted for more specific battles. Those battle honours written in bold are emblazoned on the regimental colour.

Some honours were gained by the regiment in the 1954 amalgamation with the North Shore (New Brunswick) Regiment. These honours are emblazoned on the current regimental colour; however, since 2012, when the amalgamation with the North Shores ceased, they are no longer part of the RNBR's battle honours. These honours are placed in square brackets in the list below.

 The War of 1812 

 

The non-emblazonable honorary distinction  (partly awarded in commemoration of the New Brunswick Fencibles).

South African War'''

The Great War

The Second World War

War in Afghanistan

Armouries

See also

 List of armouries in Canada
 Military history of Canada
 History of the Canadian Army
 Canadian Forces
 The Canadian Crown and the Canadian Forces
 List of Canadian organizations with royal patronage

Notes

References

Books
 "Royal New Brunswick Regiment: 1949-1958" New Brunswick Regiment (Carleton and York), 1st.; Hobson & Sons (London) Ltd.; Canada. (1949 Oct. 31 - 1958 Nov. 5.)

Alliances
 - The Royal Scots Borderers
 - The Princess of Wales's Royal Regiment (Queen's and Royal Hampshires)
 - The Yorkshire Regiment (14th/15th, 19th and 33rd/76th Foot)

External links
 1st Battalion, The Royal New Brunswick Regiment, (Carleton and York)
 2nd Battalion, The Royal New Brunswick Regiment, (North Shore)

Order of precedence

Royal New Brunswick Regiment
Infantry regiments of Canada
Military units and formations established in 1869
Military units and formations of New Brunswick
1869 establishments in Canada
Military units and formations of Canada in World War II